Amqui is a town in eastern Quebec, Canada, at the base of the Gaspé peninsula in Bas-Saint-Laurent. Located at the confluence of the Humqui and Matapédia Rivers, it is the seat of La Matapédia Regional County Municipality. The main access road is Quebec Route 132.

Etymology
The Mi'kmaq word amgoig, also written humqui, unkoui and ankwi, means "the place to have fun", "half wall" or "place of amusement and pleasure."  Another Mi'kmaq name for the area is Amkooĭk or Mkooögwĭk which aptly describes the area as "boggy."  One source postulates that its name comes from the swirling water at the junction of the Humqui and Matapédia rivers.  However, the most plausible explanation appears to be more pragmatic: Amqui was formerly a place where Amerindians gathered for pow wows.

History
Originally Mi'kmaq territory, the area was granted as a seignory by Louis de Buade de Frontenac to Charles-Nicolas-Joseph D'Amours in 1694. D'Amours died in 1728 and none of his descendants claimed the rights to the seigneury. So it remained a remote and undeveloped land until the 19th century. In 1830 construction began on the Kempt Road, a strategic military road between Quebec and the Maritimes, completed in 1833, that opened the area to colonization. But it was the construction of the Intercolonial Railway in the 1870s that brought real development.

In 1879, the post office opened under the name Amqui. In 1881, the Mission of Saint-Benoît-Joseph-Labre was established, named after Benedict Joseph Labre.  By 1884, the town became known as a great destination for salmon and trout fishing.  In 1889, the mission became a parish and the following year it was incorporated as the Parish Municipality of Saint-Benoît-Joseph-Labre.

In 1907, the village itself separated from the parish municipality and was incorporated as the Village Municipality of Saint-Benoît-Joseph-Labre, renamed to Amqui in 1948. It gained town status in 1961.

In January 1991, the Parish Municipality of Saint-Benoît-Joseph-Labre was merged into the Town of Amqui.

On March 13, 2023, a pickup truck hit eleven pedestrians along Route 132, causing two deaths and nine injuries.

Geography
Amqui is located to the south of the Saint Lawrence River in the Matapédia Valley, which was formed by the Chic-Choc Mountains. The valley is of glacial origin and was formed during the Paleozoic era millions of years ago. The region is characterized by gentle slopes through which the Matapédia river snakes from the northwest to the southeast. The city is located at the confluence of the Humqui and Matapédia rivers.

The city is situated 415 km northeast of Quebec City, 345 km west of Gaspé and 80 km north of New Brunswick. Neighbouring urban centres include Rimouski and Mont-Joli, at 105 km and 70 km to the west, respectively, and Matane, 65 km to the north. Amqui is located 25 km east of Sayabec and 20 km northwest of Causapscal, the two largest municipalities of La Matapédia after Amqui. The city borders Saint-Vianney and Saint-Tharcisius to the north, Saint-Alexandre-des-Lacs to the east, Lac-au-Saumon and Saint-Léon-le-Grand to the south, as well as Sainte-Irène and Val-Brillant to the west. The Couturval hamlet is part of Amqui.

Climate
Amqui has a humid continental climate (Dfb). Being surrounded by the Chic-Chocs creates unique climatic conditions in the region: a long and snowy winter and a hot and humid summer.

Demographics 

According to the Statistics Canada website, 6,090 of Amqui's 6,120 residents speak French as their first language.  In addition, 12% can speak both French and English.

Government

Municipal
Members of the city council are elected every four years on the first Sunday of November and are conducted electronically. It is composed of seven members:

Federal and provincial
Provincially, Amqui is represented by Pascal Bérubé in the Matane-Matapédia electoral district.

Federally, the city is represented by Kristina Michaud in the Avignon—La Mitis—Matane—Matapédia electoral district.

Infrastructure
The two-storey Amqui railway station built in 1904, is served by Via Rail's Ocean, and Montreal – Gaspé trains. Both trains share the same rail line between Montréal and Matapédia. It is protected by the federal government under the Heritage Railway Stations Protection Act since 1988.

The station is representative of the boom at the turn of the century, and the associated expansion of the railways in general, the Intercolonial Railway of Canada (IRC) in particular. Amqui depended on the railway to transport their agricultural products and finished parts made of wood. Subsequently, Amqui became an important stop on the train's route from Montréal to Halifax, and from Montréal to Gaspé.

The design of the station Amqui is unusual for a station of the IRC.  It is distinguished by its two-stage design, housing the housing of the station master and his family.

Notable people from Amqui 
 Alfred Belzile - politician and farmer.
 Sébastien Caron - goaltender for the Nashville Predators
 Cathy LeFrançois - IFBB professional bodybuilder
 Olivier Roy - goaltender drafted by the Edmonton Oilers

See also
 List of cities in Quebec

References

External links

 Ville d'Amqui official site

1870s establishments in Quebec
Populated places established in the 1870s
Cities and towns in Quebec
Designated places in Quebec
Incorporated places in Bas-Saint-Laurent
La Matapédia Regional County Municipality